William Merle Laughlin (December 10, 1915 – November 22, 1993) was an American professional basketball player. He played for the Elmira Colonels in the New York State Professional Basketball League, as well as the Cleveland White Horses in the National Basketball League. In the NBL, he averaged 8.6 points per game.

After his playing career, Laughlin served in the Navy during World War II, then became a high school teacher and basketball coach.

References

1915 births
1993 deaths
American men's basketball players
United States Navy personnel of World War II
Basketball players from Pennsylvania
Cleveland White Horses players
Forwards (basketball)
High school basketball coaches in Ohio
High school basketball coaches in Pennsylvania
People from Beaver County, Pennsylvania
Washington & Jefferson Presidents men's basketball players